Adagio is the fourth album of Sweetbox and the third album with Jade Villalon as frontwoman. It was released in 2004, in two different versions. One was released in Japan, debuting at #3, and the other was released in Europe, South Korea and Taiwan. The album was heavily inspired by world music, with songs sampling music originating from around the globe. The album also saw a hip-hop influence, furthered by guest vocalist RJ. Many of the songs showcased a far more personal approach from Jade's songwriting, dealing with topics such as spirituality and accepting the death of loved ones.

The album also contains the extended versions of "Real Emotion" and "1000 Words", which Villalon recorded for the English/international version of Final Fantasy X-2.

The track 'Chyna Girl' was originally written by Jade and Geo, for the pop group S.H.E.

Track listing

Credits
 Bass Guitar – Oliver Poschmann
 Drums – Bertil, Robbie Siemens
 Engineer – Toby Breitenbach
 Mixed By – Geoman
 Vocals [Rap] – Nicco, RJ, Meguo

Samples
 "Far Away" samples 'Oboe Concerto in D Minor' from Marcello
 "Hate Without Frontiers" samples 'Stabat Mater' from Giovanni Battista Pergolesi
 "Life Is Cool" samples 'Canon in D Major' from Johann Pachelbel
 "Miss You" samples 'Pomp & Circumstance' from Sir Edward Elgar
 "Somewhere" samples 'Ave Maria' from J.S Bach & C. Gounod
 "Sorry" samples Palladio by Karl Jenkins
 "Testimony" samples 'Cradle Song' from Grieg
 "You Can't Hide" samples 'Hannah and Her Sisters' from J.S Bach
 "Lacrimosa" samples 'Lacrimosa' from Mozart
 "Liberty" samples Kyrie (from Requiem) from Mozart

Certifications

References

2004 albums
Sweetbox albums